Peptoniphilus timonensis is a Gram-positive and anaerobic bacterium from the genus of Peptoniphilus which has been isolated from human feces from Dielmo in Senegal.

References 

Bacteria described in 2015
Eubacteriales